Grace Ononiwu CBE,  is a solicitor and Chief Crown Prosecutor, Director of Legal Services at the Crown Prosecution Service (CPS) in the UK.

Life
Ononiwu qualified as a solicitor in 1991 and joined the Crown Prosecution Service. She became Chief Crown Prosecutor for Northamptonshire in April 2005 and Legal Director for North Region, CPS London, before becoming Deputy Chief Crown Prosecutor for all the London Districts.

She was Chair of the National Black Crown Prosecution Association and was awarded a Black Solicitors Network Lifetime Achievement honor. She received an OBE in 2008 and CBE in 2019 for her services to law and order. She is a visiting professor at the University of Hertfordshire and has been awarded honorary doctorates from Hertfordshire and  Birmingham City universities. A building at Hertfordshire University has been named in her honour in 2022.

Ononiwu has been featured in the Power list of the UK’s most influential men and women of African, African Caribbean and African American heritage and was one of their Women of the Year 2020.

References 

Women lawyers
Women legal scholars
Year of birth missing (living people)
Black British lawyers
Living people